Volition Records was a Sydney, Australia-based record label specialising in electronic music styles such as house, techno, synthpop and trance. It was founded by Andrew Penhallow in the late 1980s, but folded in the late 1990s.

Amongst the roster of Volition artists were Severed Heads, Boxcar, Itch-E and Scratch-E, Single Gun Theory, FSOM, Southend, Vision Four 5, Sexing The Cherry and Robert Racic.  Racic in particular, as a record producer and co-collaborator with many of the artists on the label, was integral to much of Volition's output during most of the label's existence and was, to some extent, its unofficial "house producer".  Volition also signed a few indie pop bands such as the Falling Joys, Big Heavy Stuff and Swordfish.

See also 
 List of record labels
 List of electronic music record labels

Defunct record labels of Australia
Electronic music record labels
Techno record labels
House music record labels
Synth-pop record labels